Lillian Delia Papay (June 24, 1922–November 23, 2008) was an American politician who served for one term in the Kansas State Senate.

Born Lillian Steincamp, she grew up in Oklahoma and married her husband, Emit Papay, in 1940. During World War II, she worked as an operator in the U.S. Army Signal Corps, and after the war became a telephone operator. She and her husband were co-owners of a transportation firm in Great Bend, Kansas.

Papay entered politics late in life, serving as the Republican chair for Barton County, Kansas and as a co-chair for Bob Dole's campaign for president. In 1992, Papay was elected to the state senate from the 33rd district following the retirement of Fred Kerr. She served for one term in the Senate, and was succeeded by Laurie Bleeker. After her time in the state senate, she became mayor of Great Bend from 1997 to 1999. Papay moved to Texas after her service as mayor; her husband had died in 1998, and she remarried in Texas before dying in 2008.

References

1922 births
2008 deaths
Republican Party Kansas state senators
People from Great Bend, Kansas
20th-century American politicians
Women state legislators in Kansas
20th-century American women politicians
Women mayors of places in Kansas
People from Payne County, Oklahoma